TTXGP are the official promoters of FIM eRoadRacing, an electric motorsport race series. Founded by Azhar Hussain MBE in 2008, TTXGP started life as the first zero-carbon, clean-emission race to take place at the Isle of Man TT as teams from around the globe raced electric motorbikes.

TTXGP then grew to become a world championship before the company took up the official role as promoters of FIM eRoad Racing when TTXGP and FIM e-Power joined forces in 2013.

How TTXGP Started

The TTXGP was a new event for the 2009 Isle of Man TT races, promoted by Azhar Hussain & Hersh Patel, who took the idea forward after a number of different Manx individuals mooted the initial idea. Engineer Peter Hindley and civil servant Brian Hammond had proposed the idea of a zero-carbon TT motorcycle race on the Isle of Man to the IOM government in 2008. Hindley's proposed format, which was largely adopted, was based on that of the original 1907 TT race which valued fuel economy as well as speed.

The 2009 TTXGP was a one-lap,  race  for racing motorcycles "powered without the use of carbon based fuels and have zero toxic/noxious emissions." For 2010 the event was replaced by TT Zero, also created for zero-emissions motorcycles. In 2010, Hussain organized electric motorcycle races in North America and Europe that culminated in a world championship race in Albacete Spain.   The series expanded to include Australia in 2011 along with races in the United States and Europe.

2009

Machines

For 2009 the classes were established to cover different types of energy systems. This was changed for the 2010 season to focus exclusively on electric.

Professional Class (officially denominated as "Best Buy Pro Class")
 3a Prototype electrically propelled motorcycles. Powered solely by stored electricity (battery/accumulator)
 3b Fuel cell Class – Powered by a fuel cell device and stored electricity (battery/accumulator) if required.
 3c Conventional internal combustion engine powered machines fuelled by non-carbon-based fuel. (i.e. hydrogen). These machines must comply with all ACU regulations for racing motorcycles, including 105 dBA noise restriction.
 3d Hybrid propulsion systems.

Open Class
Electrically propelled machines, powered solely by stored electricity (battery/accumulator).

Weight
Weighed in race-ready mode.

Official qualification time

TTXGP participants - 2009 Isle of Man TT Races

2009 TTXGP Best Buy PRO Class final standings. 
12 June 2009 1 Lap Mountain Course.
TTXGP for Carbon free emission motor-cycles in PRO classes 3a-3d

2009 TTXGP OPEN Class final standings. 
12 June 2009 1 Lap Mountain Course.
TTXGP for Carbon free emission motor-cycles in OPEN class.

Conflict with FIM 

Shortly after the inaugural TTXGP race on the Isle of Man in June 2009, discussions commenced between Fédération Internationale de Motocyclisme (FIM), the international governing body of motorcycle racing, and TTXGP regarding the FIM sanction of an eGrandPrix world championship.  The TTXGP Technical Rules, which dealt with class specifications, safety of riders and marshals, and, generally, guidelines concerning the mitigation of possible hazards presented by the electric systems of the motorcycles; were shared with FIM during these discussions. In November 2009, talks broke down and, thereafter, FIM organized its own electric motorcycle racing series, denominated the e-Power.  Motorcycling's publication of record in the UK indicated that "the split arose after the FIM reneged on its original agreement with TTXGP series organisers, threatening to withdraw its backing pending payment of half a million Euros.  A witness to the proceedings claims the FIM then demanded full rights to the series. When the demand was refused the FIM then insisted the rule book – drafted by TTXGP organisers – could not be used outside the FIM’s own hastily-organised series." Another publication indicated "The FIM knew a good thing when it saw it and started working with Hussain to push electric motorcycle racing onto a much bigger stage. Things were looking rosy until the FIM walked away — and took the TTXGP’s rule book with it — in November and announced the E-Power series, four races slated to begin in May."  By January 2010, TTXGP had announced a 2010 series of races that would commence in May at Infineon Raceway, Sonoma, California, and would include races in Canada, Italy, UK and Spain.

Conflict with IOM 
TTXGP had planned to return in June 2010 to the Isle of Man to hold the second annual electric motorcycle race on the Island.  In January 2010, however, the Isle of Man Department of Tourism and Leisure announced that it would be holding its own electric motorcycle race, the TT Zero, without involvement by TTXGP.

2010

TTXGP Technical Rules Wiki 

In January 2010, TTXGP announced that it was going to utilize a wiki-based rules model. Hussain said, "We have created a rules wiki at www.egrandprix.com/wiki. You can take the 2010 rules posted there and let us know how you think they should be amended via the wiki systems. . . Our strength is our recognition that inclusion and diversity are the among the core elements of success in our new endeavour." At the time, Motorcycle News called it, "another inspired move by Hussain which helps keep his series closer to the pulse of modern race fans and participants, while leaving rival FIM look lead-footed."

TTXGP UK 2010 participants

2011

According to a joint press release by FIM and TTXGP, the two organizations combined forces for the first time in July 2011.  "In a spirit of collaboration and with the common goal of promoting electric clean emission racing, the FIM e-Power & TTXGP Championships will combine both series in a support race during the FIM MotoGP World Championship Round to be held this weekend at the Mazda Raceway Laguna Seca, California (USA)." Both championships were won in 2011 by German Münch Racing Team as constructor and Matthias Himmelmann as rider on a Münch TTE-2.

Race Results - Mazda Raceway Laguna Seca

2012
In 2012 both the FIM e-Power and the TTXGP the e-Grand Prix world titles were again won by the German Münch Racing Team as constructor with their Münch TTE-2. Its rider Matthias Himmelmann gained the FIM e-Power world title. With the TTXGP the e-Grand Prix he gained world vice championship and the European title.

2013
Following further, successful collaborations between FIM and TTXGP during the 2012 season, particularly at Laguna Seca, the two organisations announced in April 2013 they would be joining forces to create the FIM eRoadRacing World Cup.

The World Cup was announced as a one-off, season-long competition which would allow teams in Europe and the US to compete on their continents for a place in the world final. From 2014, the World Cup format would change to a World Championship meaning teams from both Europe and the US would compete at each round across three continents.

The first FIM eRoadRacing season was announced with races at Laguna Seca, Indianapolis Motor Speedway, Circuit de Valencia, Le Mans, Oschersleben and Miller Motorsports Park with a world final expected to take place during the latter months of 2013.

See also
Lightweight TT
Ultra-Lightweight TT
Sidecar TT
Junior TT
Senior TT
Auto-Cycle Union
Union Européenne de Motocyclisme
Kit bike

References

External links
Official website

 
Electric motorcycles
Green racing
Motorcycle racing organizations